Spencer Krug (born May 4, 1977) is a Canadian musician. He is the singer, songwriter and keyboardist for the indie rock band Wolf Parade and also records under the name Moonface. He has also performed with other Canadian bands including Sunset Rubdown, Swan Lake, Frog Eyes, Fifths of Seven, and ska band the Two Tonne Bowlers, playing various instruments. His involvement in many musical acts has garnered him a noticeably high output of work, being credited on several releases a year. He is known for his distinctive voice and songwriting abilities.

Overview
Krug was born on May 4, 1977 and raised in Penticton, British Columbia, where at age 12, he first began playing piano. Soon after, he picked up guitar, focusing on the two instruments. Upon leaving Penticton, he moved to Victoria, British Columbia where he helped found the indie rock band Frog Eyes with his then-roommate, Carey Mercer. Krug took part in a March 2001 recording session that would later become Frog Eyes' first LP, The Bloody Hand. Shortly afterwards, however, Krug left the band and moved to Montreal where he studied creative writing and musical composition at Concordia University. In April 2003 Krug formed Wolf Parade alongside fellow singer-songwriter/guitarist Dan Boeckner.

Wolf Parade's first show was opening for Arcade Fire on the ’03 "Us Kids Know" tour. Apologies to the Queen Mary, Wolf Parade's debut album, was produced by Modest Mouse frontman Isaac Brock and released on Seattle indie label Sub Pop on September 27, 2005.

Also in 2005, Krug teamed up with Beckie Foon (A Silver Mt. Zion, Saltland, Set Fire to Flames, Esmerine) and Rachel Levine (Cakelk), forming the instrumental string/piano/accordion-based trio Fifths of Seven. Later that year, the band released Spry from Bitter Anise Folds.

As a side project to Wolf Parade, under the moniker Sunset Rubdown, Krug self-produced five EPs, each one focusing on specific thematic composition and instrumentation – acoustic guitar; piano and hand claps; synths and drum machines, etc. – of original songs. In the mid-2005 selections from each of those EPs were compiled and released as the LP, Snake's Got a Leg.  Originally a solo project, Sunset Rubdown expanded in the late 2005 and early 2006 to include Camilla Wynn Ingr (Pony Up!), Jordan Robson-Cramer (XY Lover, Magic Weapon, and Miracle Fortress) and Michael Doerksen. This new line-up released its first collaborative efforts: a 5 track self-titled EP, Sunset Rubdown, in January 2006, followed by the band's second LP, Shut Up I Am Dreaming, in May 2006. Sunset Rubdown's third LP, Random Spirit Lover, was released October 2007 on Jagjaguwar Records.  Sunset Rubdown's fourth LP, Dragonslayer, was released in 2009 on Jagjaguwar Records.

Krug rejoined Frog Eyes as their keyboardist in early 2006 and helped put out The Future Is Inter-Disciplinary or Not at All and Tears of the Valedictorian. Wolf Parade and Frog Eyes toured that year together, allowing Krug to participate in both bands simultaneously. Krug also recorded material for the indie rock supergroup Swan Lake alongside Frog Eyes' Carey Mercer and Destroyer's Dan Bejar. The group released their debut album, Beast Moans, on November 21, 2006 through Jagjaguwar.

In mid-2008, Krug toured with Wolf Parade in support of their second LP entitled At Mount Zoomer on June 17, 2008. On March 24, 2009 Swan Lake released their second album, Enemy Mine. In January 2010, Krug released Dreamland EP: Marimba and Shit-Drums under the Moonface name. In June 2010, Wolf Parade released their third full album, Expo 86. A world tour supporting the new album followed, after which the band went on indefinite hiatus.

Krug's first full-length album as Moonface, Organ Music Not Vibraphone Like I'd Hoped, was released in August 2011. Krug then teamed up with the Helsinki-based band Siinai to record his second full length Moonface album, With Siinai: Heartbreaking Bravery, which was released on April 17, 2012. On June 29, 2012, Krug confirmed that Wolf Parade and Sunset Rubdown disbanded and would no longer be touring or releasing albums. On August 27, 2013, Jagjaguwar Records announced Krug's third full length Moonface album, Julia With Blue Jeans On, released October 29, 2013. Krug's fourth full length Moonface album, My Best Human Face, in collaboration with Finnish rock band Siinai, was released on June 3, 2016.

He appears as a collaborating musician on "Certain Father", a track from July Talk's 2023 album Remember Never Before.

Personal life
As of 2021, he resides on Vancouver Island. He and his wife had their first child, a son, in April 2020.

Discography

Fifths of Seven
Spry from Bitter Anise Folds (2005) DSA

Frog Eyes
The Bloody Hand (2002) Global Symphonic
The Future Is Inter-Disciplinary or Not at All (2006) Acuarela Discos
Tears of the Valedictorian (2007) Absolutely Kosher

Sunset Rubdown
Snake's Got a Leg (2005) Global Symphonic
Sunset Rubdown EP (2006) Global Symphonic
Shut Up I Am Dreaming (2006) Absolutely Kosher
Random Spirit Lover (2007) Jagjaguwar
Introducing Moonface (2009) Global Symphonic
Dragonslayer (2009) Jagjaguwar

Moonface
Dreamland EP: Marimba and Shit-Drums (2010) Jagjaguwar
Organ Music Not Vibraphone Like I'd Hoped (2011) Jagjaguwar
With Siinai: Heartbreaking Bravery (2012) Jagjaguwar
Julia With Blue Jeans On (2013) Jagjaguwar/Paper Bag Records
City Wrecker (EP) (2014) Jagjaguwar/Paper Bag Records
With Siinai: My Best Human Face (2016) Jagjaguwar/Paper Bag Records
This One’s For The Dancer & This One’s For The Dancer’s Bouquet (2018) Jagjaguwar

Swan Lake
Beast Moans (2006) Jagjaguwar
Enemy Mine (2009) Jagjaguwar

Wolf Parade
Wolf Parade (4-song EP)(2003) Self-Released
Wolf Parade (6-song EP) (2004) Self-Released
Wolf Parade (EP) (2005) Sub Pop
Apologies to the Queen Mary (2005, reissued 2016) Sub Pop
At Mount Zoomer (2008) Sub Pop
Expo 86 (2010) Sub Pop
EP 4 (2016) Self-Released
Cry Cry Cry (2017) Sub Pop
Thin Mind (2020) Sub Pop

Solo albums
Fading Graffiti (2021) Pronounced Kroog
Twenty Twenty Twenty Twenty One (2022) Pronounced Kroog

Notable contributions
 In 2005, Krug contributed to the UNICEF benefit song, "Do They Know It's Hallowe'en?" along with Dan Boeckner.
 In 2006, Krug contributed piano and synthesizer to Islands' first album, "Return to the Sea"
 Krug played keyboard for Destroyer's European Tour of Notorious Lightning & Other Works.

References

External links

 Official Wolf Parade page
 Official Sunset Rubdown page
 Official Fifths of Seven page
 Official Swan Lake page
 Official page

1977 births
Living people
People from Penticton
Canadian singer-songwriters
Canadian indie rock musicians
Musicians from British Columbia
Concordia University alumni
Paper Bag Records artists
21st-century Canadian male singers
Canadian male singer-songwriters